Lucie Lahaye (born 21 November 1997) is a French professional racing cyclist, who most recently rode for UCI Women's Continental Team . Lahaye had been a member of the team from 2017, including its first UCI season in 2019.

References

External links
 

1997 births
Living people
French female cyclists
Place of birth missing (living people)